Roger Clemens' MVP Baseball is a baseball video game released in North America by Acclaim Entertainment during the years of 1991 and 1992 for the NES, Game Boy, Super NES, and Sega Genesis. All of the ballplayers have the likenesses and abilities of the 1991 Major League Baseball players they represent. However, since the game is not licensed by the Major League Baseball Players Association, the only player whose name appears in the game is, of course, AL Cy Young Award Winner Roger Clemens. The 26 teams featured in the game correspond to the 1991 MLB teams as well, though team nicknames have been changed due to the lack of an MLB license as well.

Kingsley Thurber, the composer for Roger Clemens' MVP Baseball, also did the music for the Super NES version of Mortal Kombat along with Virtual Bart, Looney Tunes B-Ball and various WWF video games.

Gameplay
The game features 26 teams to use, an exhibition mode and a regular season mode consisting of 162 games. The game allowed players to "save" their career progress by giving them a password. Players had to memorize it and enter it at the menu screen when they wanted to continue the season.

By pushing a certain sequence of buttons on the Super NES version, a screen can be accessed where the variables for offense (pitchers/runners) and defense (fielding) can be edited. Another test mode can be found by virtue of using either Game Genie or Pro Action Replay on the Super NES version; which acts more like a traditional cheat menu then the debug menu.

The Super NES controls puts more emphasis on defense rather than offense as the majority of possible move combinations correspond to pitching a baseball to the batter. Base running is considered to be of secondary importance in the game while batting is considered to be simple by Super NES standards.

Criticism
Roger Clemens' MVP Baseball is scolded for having an inferior sense of gameplay to Bases Loaded 2; which was also a baseball game featuring an entirely fictional cast of ballplayers. The confusing angles for fielding essentially ruin the enjoyment of following the ball's shadow in order to put out a runner.

Player Name Humor
While many of the fictional players in the game have names that are simply mutations of their real names (i.e. "Gaddox" and "Fieldman" are Greg Maddux and Cecil Fielder respectively), the game programmers appear to have had a bit of fun with some of them, poking fun at the names of some of the real players they are intended to represent. Some examples follow below:

 Darryl Strawberry is "Raspberry" (or simply "Berry" in other versions of the game).
 Barry Bonds is "Barris"
 George Bell is "Dell".
 Steve Sax is "Clarinet".
 Joe Carter is "Carr".
 Jack Clark is "Dark".
 David Justice is "Judge".
 Darren Daulton is "Davis"
 Dwight Gooden is "Doctor", in reference to his nicknames "Doc", along with "Dr. K."
 Rob Deer is "Bambi".
 Lenny Dykstra is "Nails", in reference to his nickname "Nails".
 Tim Raines is "Snows".
 David Cone is "Conehead," perhaps an homage to the comedy sketch which first appeared on Saturday Night Live and would later become a movie.
 Don Mattingly is "Matts".
 Mark McGwire and Jose Canseco are both named "Bash", in reference to their being nicknamed the 'Bash Brothers' while teammates with the Oakland Athletics.
 Kirby Puckett is known simply as "Kirby" as his last name (or "Tripp" in other versions of the game).
 Kirk Gibson is "Gibbons".
 Vance Law is "Order".
 Cal Ripken Jr. is "Nekpir," which is simply his last name spelled backwards.
 Ryne Sandberg is "Sharp".
 Ozzie Smith is "Wizard" - after his well-known nickname
 Frank Thomas is "Thompson".
 Tony Fernandez is "Nandez"
 Tony Gwynn is "Wynn"
 Mike Moore is "Less"
 Rickey Henderson is "Speed"
 Robin Ventura is "Vender".
 Dave Winfield is "Winbrener", in reference to Winfield's public feud with New York Yankees owner George Steinbrenner throughout the 1980s before his trade to the California Angels in 1990.

References

1991 video games
1992 video games
Nintendo Entertainment System games
Super Nintendo Entertainment System games
Game Boy games
Sega Genesis games
Baseball video games
LJN games
Multiplayer and single-player video games
Video games developed in the United States
Clemens
Clemens
Video games based on real people